Yumjaagiin Tsedenbal (Yumzhaagiin Tsedenbal ;  ; 17 September 1916 – 20 April 1991) was the leader of the Mongolian People's Republic from 1952 to 1984. 

During his political life, he served as Chairman of the Presidium of the People's Great Khural (head of state), Prime Minister of Mongolia (head of government) and General Secretary of the Mongolian People's Revolutionary Party (head of the ruling party). He was the longest-serving leader of any Eastern Bloc country, serving over 30 years in office until his expulsion in August 1984.

Early life
Tsedenbal was born to a poor ethnic Dörvöd nomadic family in Zorigt Khan hoshuu of the Unen Zorigt Khan aimag (present day Davst sum in Uvs aimag). He was the fifth of eleven children in his family, with three of his siblings dying in infancy.

In 1925 Tsedenbal was among the first students in the newly organized public school in Ulaangom, graduating in 1929. The same year Tsedenbal went to Irkutsk to continue his education. He spent about nine years between Irkutsk and Ulan-Ude, where he learned the Russian language and later obtained a degree from the Siberian Finance and Economics Institute.

Party career

In 1939, having returned to Ulaanbaatar, Tsedenbal worked first as a deputy minister, and then as the Minister of Finance from 1939 to 1940. Additionally, he was the governor of Bank of Mongolia at that time. In 1940, at the 10th Congress of the Mongolian People's Revolutionary Party, he became General Secretary at age 23 and again in 1958 during his premiership.

Rise to power and tenure as leader of Mongolia 
After taking over minor leadership in 1952 following Marshal Khorloogiin Choibalsan's death, Tsedenbal successfully purged his political rivals: Dashiin Damba in 1958–59, Daramyn Tömör-Ochir in 1962, Luvsantserengiin Tsend in 1963, and the so-called Lookhuuz-Nyambuu-Surmaajav "anti-party group" in December 1964. He held this office until 11 June 1974, when he eventually became head of state, thus making him the supreme ruler of the Mongolian People's Republic.

Policies

Economic

Foreign

Relations with the USSR 

His foreign policy was marked by efforts to bring Mongolia into ever-closer cooperation with the USSR. Still, Tsedenbal and his group of party leaders (such as Tsagaan-Lamyn Dugersuren and Damdinjavyn Maidar) were dissatisfied with the economic role that the Soviet leadership assigned to Mongolia. While the USSR prodded the Mongolian government to concentrate its efforts on the development of agriculture and the mineral sector, Tsedenbal and his followers sought to foster rapid industrialization even in the face of Soviet opposition. At the same time, Tsedenbal was cautious enough to frequently express his loyalty to the Kremlin and portray his intra-party critics—including Daramyn Tömör-Ochir, Tsogt-Ochiryn Loohuuz, and others—as "pro-Chinese factionalists" and "nationalists".

With the full backing of the Soviets, Tsedenbal successfully purged his political opponents. During his reign as head of the state, Tsedenbal submitted requests for the incorporation of Mongolia into the USSR on five to eight occasions, but these proposals were invariably rejected by the Soviet leaders. 

With the intensification of the Sino-Soviet border conflict in the 1960s, the signing of "The Treaty of Friendship, Cooperation and Mutual Assistance between the USSR and the Mongolian People's Republic" in Ulaanbaatar in early 1966 by Brezhnev and Tsedenbal, allowed the Soviet Union to station troops in Mongolia to ensure mutual defense, being the first time that foreign troops would be stationed in the republic.

Relations with China 

In the early years of his rule, he favored balanced relations between Mongolia and China. In 1959, Tsedenbal was in Beijing for the 10th anniversary of the People's Republic of China.

At the time of the Sino-Soviet split, Tsedenbal decisively sided with the Soviet Union and incurred China's wrath. Despite this, the two countries managed to sign a border treaty in 1962. In the early 1960s, he signed an order expelling all Chinese citizens from Mongolia. The resolution was met with outrage: "Break off Tsedenbal's dog's head," was written onto the Mongolian embassy, and Mao Zedong and Zhou Enlai stated that "Comrade Tsedenbal is trampling on diplomacy."

Other communist nations 
In July 1956, he welcomed North Korean leader Kim Il-sung on a state visit. As it relates to the Korean conflict, Tsedenbal, during a 1971 visit of the North Korean Deputy Premier in honor of the 50th anniversary of the Mongolian People’s Revolution, declared that his nation "strongly support the struggle of the Korean people to unify the motherland by peaceful, democratic means and for the liberation of South Korea." During the Vietnam War, he supported the Soviet position, in part due to the stance of the Chinese in this regard.

Tsedenbal visited Bucharest on 9 September 1957, becoming the first Mongolian leader to visit Romania. His relationship with President Nicolae Ceaușescu proved to be frosty, being critical of the latter for his more independent foreign policy.

Other nations 
Mongolia under Tsedenbal increased its participation in international organizations, attempting first in 1955 to have the MPR join the United Nations (with the request being vetoed by the Republic of China on the island of Taiwan) and being admitted into the UN in 1961. Under Tsedenbal, Mongolia established ties with West Germany on January 31, 1974.

During a February 1973 visit to New Delhi, an Indo-Mongolian joint declaration was signed by Tsedenbal and Indira Gandhi. Furthermore, he supported India in the Bangladesh Liberation War of 1971, at the expense of relations with Pakistan.

Social

Other policies 
In 1970, Mongolia under his leadership was awarded the UNESCO Special Prize for Literacy.

Views on the incorporation of Mongolia in the USSR 

He was an adamant supporter of the incorporation of Mongolia into the USSR during the first half of his career, particularly in the 1960s and 1970s. In 1950, Tsedenbal faced severe rebuke after demanding that Choibolsan petition for Mongolia's incorporation as per the example of Tuva. The only other Eastern Bloc leader with similar aspirations was Todor Zhivkov.

In his later years, he reversed his views. In an interview, his son Zorig told that Tsedenbal had once exchanged his views with Leonid Brezhnev on the topic while on vacation in Crimea at the latter's invitation. At one point, Brezhnev asked him, "Why not join us?" Initially, Tsedenbal attempted to evade the question. After Brezhnev became irritated and repeated the question, Tsedenbal responded, "As the head of state of Mongolia, I have one thing to say. We are ready to cooperate 100 percent with the Soviet Union in all areas, including the economy, culture, arts, sports and defense. On the most important condition that we remain an independent state."

Ousting 
Tsedenbal was forced into retirement in August 1984 in a Soviet-sponsored move, officially on the account of his old age and mental weakness but at least partly because of his opposition to the process of Sino-Soviet rapprochement that had started with Leonid Brezhnev's Tashkent speech in March 1982. Jambyn Batmönkh became the general secretary of the MPRP. Tsedenbal was removed a month after receiving Vietnamese head of state Trường Chinh and just days away before he was due to attend a ceremony in honor of the 45th anniversary of the Soviet-Mongolian victory in the Battle of Khalkhin Gol.

Later life and death 
Tsedenbal remained in Moscow until his death. During this period, Tsedenbal repeatedly asked the Central Committee of the MPRP and the Mongolian Embassy in Moscow to visit him, but no one accepted his request. In 1990, he was deprived of the title of Hero of the MPR, Mongolian state awards and the military rank of Marshal of the MPR. 

He died on 20 April 1991 at a Moscow hospital. According to a medical report, the cause of death was "bile duct cancer, purulent poisoning and chronic liver failure." After he died, his body was brought to Mongolia five days later, where he was buried with military honors. The funeral was held at the Officers' Palace on April 29, and was taken to the Altan-Ölgii National Cemetery for burial. Many complained that the government commission did not allow the public to view his body. After spats between government members arose over how he should be buried, the then-Minister of Defense, General Shagalyn Jadambaa, ordered that he be buried with the honors of a general. When Tsedenbal's wife arrived in Ulaanbaatar from Moscow to attend Tsedenbal's funeral, the Mongolian prosecutor's office attempted to interrogate her.

By the decree of President Punsalmaagiin Ochirbat in 1997, the 1990 decree that stripped him of his rank and awards was invalidated.

Legacy

In Mongolia, Tsedenbal is remembered for successfully maintaining a path of relatively moderate socialism during the Cold War. A statue of Tsedenbal was built in 2000 on the plaza in front of the National Drama Academic Theater which has since been renamed to Tsedenbal Square (Цэдэнбалын талбай). The statue and its surroundings were refurbished in 2013. On September 21, 2016, the Erdenet Mining Corporation was named after him.

In 2019, Mongolian filmmakers produced a biographical film of Tsedenbal. His son Zorig founded the Tsedenbal Academy in Mongolia.

Personal life 
His Russian wife, Anastasia Filatova, was often said to be the most powerful political figure in Mongolia due to her close relationship with the Soviet leader Leonid Brezhnev. They had two children, Vladislav (7 October 1949 - c. 2000) and Zorig (born 11 March 1957). The sons' surnames were reduplicated from their patronymic in Russian (e.g. Владислав Цэдэнбалович Цэдэнбал). His granddaughter Anastasia Tsedenbal (Анастасия Зоригновна Цэдэнбал), born in 1985, graduated from the Lomonosov Moscow State University as an African researcher.

Awards 
:
 Hero of the Mongolian People's Republic (1966)
 Hero of Labor of the Mongolian People's Republic (1961)
 5 Orders of Sukhbaatar
 2 Orders of the Red Banner
 Order of the Red Banner of Labor 
 Order of Friendship
 Medal "For Victory over Japan"
 Medal "30 year anniversary of the Victory over Japan"
 Medal "25th Anniversary of Mongolian People's Revolution"
 Medal "30 year anniversary of the Battle of Khalkhin Gol"
 Medal "40 year anniversary of the Battle of Khalkhin Gol"
 Medal "50 years of the Mongolian People's Republic" 
 Medal "50 years of the Mongolian People's Army"

:
 3 Orders of Lenin (1944, 1976, 1986)
 Order of the October Revolution
 Order of Kutuzov, 1st class
 Medal "For the Victory over Germany in the Great Patriotic War 1941–1945" 
 Medal "For the Victory over Japan"
 Jubilee Medal "In Commemoration of the 100th Anniversary of the Birth of Vladimir Ilyich Lenin"
 Jubilee Medal "Twenty Years of Victory in the Great Patriotic War 1941-1945"
 Jubilee Medal "Thirty Years of Victory in the Great Patriotic War 1941–1945"
 Jubilee Medal "50 Years of the Armed Forces of the USSR"
 Jubilee Medal "60 Years of the Armed Forces of the USSR"

Other countries:
 2 Orders of Georgi Dimitrov (Bulgaria)
 Order of Jose Marti (Cuba)
 Order of the White Lion, 1st class (Czechoslovakia)
 Order of Karl Marx (East Germany)
 Order of Friendship of Peoples (East Germany)
 Order of the National Flag (Hungary)
 Order of the National Flag, 1st class (North Korea)
 Order of the Grand Cross of the Rebirth of Poland (Poland)
 Great Star of the Order of the Yugoslav Star (Yugoslavia)

Notes

References

Further reading
Batbayar, Tsedendambyn. Modern Mongolia: A Concise History. Ulaanbaatar: 2002.
Nadirov, Sh. G. Tsedenbal and the Events of August 1984. Trans. Baasan Ragchaa. Bloomington (Ind.): Mongolia Society, 2005.
Rupen, Robert. How Mongolia is Really Ruled. A Political History of the Mongolian People’s Republic, 1900–1978. Stanford (Cal.): Hoover Institution Press, 1979.
Shinkarev, Leonid. Tsedenbal i Filatova. Liubov’, vlast’, tragedia. Moscow and Irkutsk: Izdatel’ Sapronov, 2004.

1916 births
1991 deaths
Mongolian communists
Mongolian atheists
Mongolian expatriates in the Soviet Union
Mongolian People's Party politicians
Oirats
Recipients of the Order of Lenin
Recipients of the Order of Kutuzov, 1st class
Recipients of the Order of Polonia Restituta (1944–1989)
Recipients of the Order of the White Lion
Recipients of the Order of Georgi Dimitrov
Finance ministers of Mongolia
Governors of Bank of Mongolia
Speakers of the State Great Khural
World War II political leaders
Communism in Mongolia
Marshal of the Mongolian People's Republic
People from Uvs Province